Stephen Delaney (born 1962/63) is an Irish cyclist. He won the Rás Tailteann in 1984.

Career
Stephen Delaney won the 1984 Rás Tailteann.

Personal and later life
Delaney is a triathlon coach.

References

External links

Irish male cyclists
Rás Tailteann winners
Year of birth uncertain